Max Jiménez, one of Costa Rica's important early writers, was born in San José, Costa Rica in 1900. His literary works include novels, short stories, essays and poetry, but he is best known for his novel El jaúl (1937), which tells a series of events in an agricultural community in Costa Rica, though the events transcend the country itself. His works were largely discredited during his lifetime. He died in 1947 in Buenos Aires, Argentina.

Published works
Ensayos (1926)
Unos fantoches (1928)
Gleba (1929)
Sonaja (1930)
Quijongo (1933)
Revenar (1936)
El domador de pulgas (1936)
El jaúl, novela (1937)
Candelillas (1965) 
Obra literaria de Max Jiménez / editado por Stvdivm Generale Costarricense. (1984) 
Max Jiménez / estudio y compilación de Alfonso Chase. (2000) 
Toda la poesía: poesía 1929–1936 / Selección y prólogo Alfonso Chase. (2000) 
Obra literaria / Compilador, Alvaro Quesada Soto. (2004)

Criticism
Max Jiménez: catálogo razonado / Floria A. Barrionuevo Ch-A., Mariá Enriqueta Guardia Y. (1999)
Max Jiménez: aproximaciones críticas / compilador, Álvaro Quesada Soto. (1999)

References

External links 
 Entry for Max Jiménez on The National Library of Costa Rica's biographical dictionary : http://www.sinabi.go.cr/DiccionarioBiograficoDetail/biografia/149
 Digitised version of El domador de pulgas :
 http://www.sinabi.go.cr/ver/Biblioteca%20Digital/LIBROS%20COMPLETOS/Jimenez%20Max/El%20domador%20de%20pulgas.pdf
 Digitised version of El jaúl : http://www.sinabi.go.cr/ver/Biblioteca%20Digital/LIBROS%20COMPLETOS/Jimenez%20Max/Renevar.pdf
 Max Jiménez'''s biography by Editorial de Costa Rica'', in spanish : https://www.editorialcostarica.com/escritores.cfm?detalle=1224

Costa Rican male poets
20th-century Costa Rican poets
Male essayists
Costa Rican male essayists
Costa Rican male short story writers
Costa Rican short story writers
Male novelists
Costa Rican novelists
1900 births
1947 deaths
Writers from San José, Costa Rica
20th-century male writers
20th-century essayists